Sphagnum is a genus of approximately 380 accepted species of mosses, commonly known as sphagnum moss, also bog moss and quacker moss (although that term is also sometimes used for peat). Accumulations of Sphagnum can store water, since both living and dead plants can hold large quantities of water inside their cells; plants may hold 16 to 26 times as much water as their dry weight, depending on the species. The empty cells help retain water in drier conditions.

As Sphagnum moss grows, it can slowly spread into drier conditions, forming larger mires, both raised bogs and blanket bogs. Thus, Sphagnum can influence the composition of such habitats, with some describing Sphagnum as 'habitat manipulators'. These peat accumulations then provide habitat for a wide array of peatland plants, including sedges and ericaceous shrubs, as well as orchids and carnivorous plants.

Sphagnum and the peat formed from it do not decay readily because of the phenolic compounds embedded in the moss's cell walls. In addition, bogs, like all wetlands, develop anaerobic soil conditions, which produces slower anaerobic decay rather than aerobic microbial action. Peat moss can also acidify its surroundings by taking up cations, such as calcium and magnesium, and releasing hydrogen ions.

Under the right conditions, peat can accumulate to a depth of many meters. Different species of Sphagnum have different tolerance limits for flooding and pH, so any one peatland may have a number of different Sphagnum species.

Individual peat moss plants consist of a main stem, with tightly arranged clusters of branch fascicles usually consisting of two or three spreading branches and two to four hanging branches. The top of the plant, or capitulum, has compact clusters of young branches. Along the stem are scattered leaves of various shapes, named stem leaves; the shape varies according to species. The leaves consist of two kinds of cells: small, green, living cells (chlorophyllose cells), and large, clear, structural, dead cells (hyaline cells). The latter have the large water-holding capacity.

Sphagnum structure
Sphagnum have a distinct structure adapted to the watery habitats they live in. The water supports Sphagnum plants, making other strengthening structures unnecessary. The top of the plant is called the capitulum, a rosette of leaves which gather the majority of the plant's energy through photosynthesis. The main body consists of a stem and branches, with leaves also protruding from both the stem and the branches. The lowermost parts of the plant are dead but partially decomposed.

Cellular structure

Sphagnum has a distinctive cellular structure. Mosses have no vascular system to move water and nutrients around the plant. Thus tissues are thin and usually one cell thick to allow these to diffuse easily. Sphagnum mosses have two distinct cell types. There are normal photosynthesising cells with chlorophyll. Additionally there are larger Aline or retort cells. These are barrel shaped. They have pores and soak up water like a sponge. These unique cells mean Sphagnum can keep the habitat watery by releasing water to keep bogs waterlogged. Walker (2019) describes Sphagnum thus as 'habitat manipulators'.

Lifecycle
Sphagnum, like all other land plants, has an alternation of generations; like other bryophytes, the haploid gametophyte generation is dominant and persistent. Unlike other mosses, the long-lived gametophytes do not rely upon rhizoids to assist in water uptake.

Sphagnum species can be unisexual (male or female, dioecious) or bisexual (male and female gametes produced from the same plant; monoecious); In North America, 80% of Sphagnum species are unisexual.

Gametophytes have substantial asexual reproduction by fragmentation, producing much of the living material in sphagnum peatlands.

Swimming sperm fertilize eggs contained in archegonia that remain attached to the female gametophyte. The sporophyte is relatively short-lived, and consists almost entirely of a shiny green, spherical spore capsule that becomes black with spores. Sporophytes are raised on stalks to facilitate spore dispersal, but unlike other mosses, Sphagnum stalks are produced by the maternal gametophyte. Tetrahedral haploid spores are produced in the sporophyte by meiosis, which are then dispersed when the capsule explosively discharges its cap, called an operculum, and shoots the spores some distance. The spores germinate to produce minute protonemae, which start as filaments, can become thalloid, and can produce a few rhizoids. Soon afterwards, the protonema develops buds and these differentiate into its characteristic, erect, leafy, branched gametophyte with chlorophyllose cells and hyaline cells. This stage dominates the environment where Sphagnum grows, obliterating and burying the protonema and eventually building up into layers of dead moss called peat.

Carpets of living Sphagnum may be attacked by various fungi, and one fungus that is also a mushroom, Sphagnurus paluster, produces conspicuous dead patches. When this fungus and other agarics attack the protonema, Sphagnum is induced to produce nonphotosynthetic gemmae that can survive the fungal attack and months later germinate to produce new protonema and leafy gametophytes. It is unknown whether the leafy stage can produce such gemmae.

Taxonomy and phylogeny

Peat moss can be distinguished from other moss species by its unique branch clusters. The plant and stem color, the shape of the branch and stem leaves, and the shape of the green cells are all characteristics used to identify peat moss to species. Sphagnum taxonomy has been very contentious since the early 1900s; most species require microscopic dissection to be identified. In the field, most Sphagnum species can be identified to one of four major sections of the genus—classification and descriptions follow Andrus 2007 (Flora North America):

Sphagnum sect. Acutifolia plants generally form hummocks above the water line, usually colored orange or red. Examples: Sphagnum fuscum and Sphagnum warnstorfii.
Sphagnum sect. Cuspidata plants are usually found in hollows, lawns, or are aquatic, and are green. Examples: Sphagnum cuspidatum and Sphagnum flexuosum.
Sphagnum sect. Sphagnum plants have the largest gametophytes among the sections, forming large hummocks, their leaves form cuculate (hood-shaped) apices, and are green, except for Sphagnum magellanicum Example: Sphagnum austinii.
Sphagnum sect. Subsecunda plants vary in color from green to yellow and orange (but never red), and are found in hollows, lawns, or are aquatic. Species always with unisexual gametophytes. Examples: Sphagnum lescurii and Sphagnum pylaesii.

The reciprocal monophyly of these sections and two other minor ones (Rigida and Squarrosa) has been clarified using molecular phylogenetics. All but two species normally identified as Sphagnum reside in one clade; two other species have recently been separated into new families within the Sphagnales reflecting an ancestral relationship with the Tasmanian endemic Ambuchanania and long phylogenetic distance to the rest of Sphagnum. Within main clade of Sphagnum, phylogenetic distance is relatively short, and molecular dating methods suggest nearly all current Sphagnum species are descended from a radiation that occurred just 14 million years ago.

Geographic distribution

Sphagnum mosses occur mainly in the Northern Hemisphere in peat bogs, conifer forests, and moist tundra areas. Their northernmost populations lie in the archipelago of Svalbard, Arctic Norway, at 81° N.

In the Southern Hemisphere, the largest peat areas are in southern Chile and Argentina, part of the vast Magellanic moorland (circa 44,000 square km; 17,000 sq. mi.). Peat areas are also found in New Zealand and Tasmania. In the Southern Hemisphere, however, peat landscapes may contain many moss species other than Sphagnum. Sphagnum species are also reported from "dripping rocks" in mountainous, subtropical Brazil.

Spore dispersal
As with many other mosses, Sphagnum species disperse spores through the wind. The tops of spore capsules are only about 1 cm (") above ground, and where wind is weak. As the spherical spore capsule dries, the operculum is forced off, followed by a cloud of spores. The exact mechanism has traditionally attributed to a "pop gun" method using air compressed in the capsule, reaching a maximum velocity of 3.6 meters (12') per second, but alternative mechanisms have been recently proposed. High-speed photography has shown vortex rings are created during the discharge, which enable the spores to reach a height of 10 to 20 cm (4" to 8"), further than would be expected by ballistics alone. The acceleration of the spores is about 36,000G. Spores are extremely important in establishment of new populations in disturbed habitats and on islands.

Human activities like slash-and-burn and cattle grazing are believed to promote the growth and expansion of Sphagnum moss. Oceanic islands such as the Faroe Islands, the Galápagos or the Azores have recorded a significant increase in their Sphagnum populations after human settlement.

Uses

Decayed, dried sphagnum moss has the name of peat or peat moss. This is used as a soil conditioner which increases the soil's capacity to hold water and nutrients by increasing capillary forces and cation exchange capacity – uses that are particularly useful in gardening. This is often desired when dealing with very sandy soil, or plants that need increased or steady moisture content to flourish. A distinction is sometimes made between sphagnum moss, the live moss growing on top of a peat bog, and 'sphagnum peat moss' (North American usage) or 'sphagnum peat' (British usage), the latter being the slowly decaying matter underneath.

Dried sphagnum moss is used in northern Arctic regions as an insulating material.

Anaerobic acidic sphagnum bogs have low rates of decay, and hence preserve plant fragments and pollen to allow reconstruction of past environments. They even preserve human bodies for millennia; examples of these preserved specimens are Tollund Man, Haraldskær Woman, Clonycavan Man and Lindow Man. Such bogs can also preserve human hair and clothing, one of the most noteworthy examples being Egtved Girl, Denmark. Because of the acidity of peat, however, bones are dissolved rather than preserved. These bogs have also been used to preserve food. Up to 2000-year-old containers of butter or lard have been found.

Sphagnum moss has been used for centuries as a dressing for wounds, including through World War I. Preparations using Sphagnum such as Sphagnol soap have been used for various skin conditions including acne, ringworm, and eczema. The soap was used by the British Red Cross during both World Wars to treat facial wounds and trench sores.

Since it is absorptive and extremely acidic, it inhibits growth of bacteria and fungi, so it is used for shipping seeds and live plants.

Peat moss is used to dispose of the clarified liquid output (effluent) from septic tanks in areas that lack the proper conditions for ordinary disposal means. It is also used as an environmentally friendly alternative to chlorine in swimming pool sanitation. The moss inhibits the growth of microbes and reduces the need for chlorine in swimming pools.

In Finland, peat mosses have been used to make bread during famines.

In China, Japan and Korea, long strand dried sphagnum moss is traditionally used as a potting medium for cultivating Vanda falcata orchids.

Conservation

Several of the world's largest wetlands are sphagnum-dominated bogs, including the West Siberian Lowland, the Hudson Bay Lowland and the Mackenzie River Valley. These areas provide habitat for common and rare species. They also store large amounts of carbon, which helps reduce global warming.

The U.S. gets up to 80% of sphagnum peat moss it uses from Canada. In Canada, the peat bog mass harvested each year is an estimated 1/60th of the mass that accumulates. About 0.02% of the 1.1 million km2 (422,000 square miles) of Canadian peat bog are used for peat moss mining. Some efforts are being made to restore peat bogs after peat mining, and some debate exists as to whether the peat bogs can be restored to their premining condition and how long the process takes. "The North American Wetlands Conservation Council estimates that harvested peatlands can be restored to 'ecologically balanced systems' within five to 20 years after peat harvesting." Some wetlands scientists assert that "a managed bog bears little resemblance to a natural one. Like tree farms, these peatlands tend toward monoculture, lacking the biodiversity of an unharvested bog."

PittMoss, a peat moss alternative made from recycled newspaper, has emerged as a sustainable substitute in growing media. Coir has also been touted as a sustainable alternative to peat moss in growing media. Another peat moss alternative is manufactured in California from sustainably harvested redwood fiber. Semi-open cell polyurethane materials available in flaked and sheet stock are also finding application as sphagnum replacements with typical usage in green wall and roof garden substrates.

Chile

In the 2010s, Sphagnum peat in Chile has begun to be harvested at a large scale for export to countries like Japan, South Korea, Taiwan and the United States. Given Sphagnum’s property to absorb excess water and release it during dry months harvesting of Sphagnum, means that overexploitation may threaten the water supply in the fjords and channels of Chile. Extraction of Sphagnum in Chile is regulated by law since 2 August 2018. Since 2018 Chilean law allows only for the manual extraction of Sphagnum using only pitchforks or similar tools as an aid. In a given area (polygon) at least 30% of Sphagnum coverage has to be left unharvested. Harvested Sphagnum fibers may not exceed 15 cm (6") in length and the remaining Sphagnum after harvest may never have a length less than 5 cm (2") over the water table. In the regions of Los Ríos (40°S) and Los Lagos (41–43°S) the same plots may be harvested after 12 years, while further south in Aysén (44–48°S) and Magallanes (49–56°S) 85 years have to pass before the same area is harvested again.

Harvesting aside, bogs where Sphagnum grows have also come under threat by the development of wind farms in cool humid areas such as the Cordillera del Piuchén where the San Pedro Wind Farm was constructed in the 2010s. The construction of each wind turbine usually implies the removal of vegetation and the alteration of the soil, changing by the way also of the local hydrology.

Europe
Europe has a long history of the exploitation of peatlands. The Netherlands, for example, once had large areas of peatland, both fen and bog. Between 100 AD and the present, they were drained and converted to agricultural land. The English broadlands have small lakes that originated as peat mines.
More than 90% of the bogs in England have been damaged or destroyed. A handful of bogs has been preserved through government buyouts of peat-mining interests. Over longer time scales, however, some parts of England, Ireland, Scotland, and Wales have seen expansion of bogs, particularly blanket bogs, in response to deforestation and abandonment of agricultural land.

New Zealand
New Zealand has, like other parts of the world, lost large areas of peatland. The latest estimates for wetland loss in New Zealand are 90% over 150 years. In some cases, better care is taken during the harvesting of Sphagnum to ensure enough moss is remaining to allow regrowth. An 8-year cycle is suggested, but some sites require a longer cycle of 11 to 32 years for full recovery of biomass, depending on factors including whether reseeding is done, the light intensity, and the water table. This "farming" is based on a sustainable management program approved by New Zealand's Department of Conservation; it ensures the regeneration of the moss, while protecting the wildlife and the environment. Most harvesting in New Zealand swamps is done only using pitchforks without the use of heavy machinery. During transportation, helicopters are commonly employed to transfer the newly harvested moss from the swamp to the nearest road.

References

External links
 Michaelis, Dierk (2019): The Sphagnum Species of the World. 435 p. Schweizerbart Describes anatomy and morphology of Sphagnum, explains reproductive biology, research history and phylogenesis of peat mosses. The systematic part: Description and identification of the sections, keys for all peat moss species by continent, and Sphagnum species lists for 20 phytogeographic regions of the world. Keys for Africa, Europe and North America are based on existing data and were revised and supplemented.
 Website about sphagnum farming in Germany, in English and German
 On-line guide to Sphagnum
 Guide to wetland restoration in New Zealand
 Poster guide to Sphagnum

 
Bogs
Moss genera
Bryophyta of Australasia
Bryophyta of North America
Pakihi
Taxa named by Carl Linnaeus